Windermere Preparatory School is a private, coeducational PK–12 college preparatory school in Lake Butler, an unincorporated area in Orange County, Florida, within the Orlando metropolitan area. Established in 2000 and in proximity to the Town of Windermere, it is accredited by the Southern Association of Colleges and Schools, Southern Association of Independent Schools, Florida Council of Independent Schools, and International Baccalaureate World School. It is a part of the Nord Anglia Education network.

History
The school opened on September 5, 2000 using temporary classrooms, with an enrollment of 184 students and 25 teachers. Today, that enrollment has grown to 1,520 students including day and boarding on a  campus on Lake Cypress.

Windermere Preparatory School opened on September 5, 2000, with an enrollment of 184 students housed in 12 portable classrooms, and taught by 25 faculty members. In the last thirteen years the school has grown to 1,400 students.

Presently, WPS employs over 160 faculty and staff.

In 2016 it had 1,200 students.
In 2021, the school reported 1,800 students.

Academics
Windermere Preparatory School offers PK3 – Grade 12 education, plus boarding for Grades 7–12 under the Nord Anglia Education Family of Schools.

Activities

Athletics
Windermere Prep competes in Florida High School Athletic Association's Legislative Division 16.

In 2007, a player on the boys golf team won the FHSAA Regionals, and went on to finish 31st at the FSHAA State Finals.  The Windermere Prep Blue basketball team came in second place and the Red Team came in 1st place in each of their leagues. In 2016, the Windermere Prep Boys Varsity Basketball Team won the Florida State Championships and the city of Windermere named March 8, 2016 "Windermere Prep State Championship Day."

From 2013 to 2015, an individual distance runner won 6 state titles in both cross country and track & field. Won the state championship two years in a row at cross country, 1600m run, and 3200m run.

Robotics Team 
WPS also has a robotics team that competes in the FIRST Robotics Competition. In 2006, Team 1649, aka Team EMS (Engineers Mentoring Students), won the FIRST Florida Regional. It also won the FIRST Florida Regional in 2009, and went on to finish as semifinalists at the FIRST Championship, ranking 18th worldwide. Along with regional champion awards, the team has been recognized with other awards such as the Rookie All Star Award, Innovation in Control Award, Judge's Award, and most recently the 2011 Florida Regional Creativity Award.

Girls Golf Team 
In 2010 and 2011, the girls golf team won back to back FSHAA State Championships led by Shannon Aubert, the individual winner of the state championship. The girls team has produced many college golfers that went on to compete at schools like Stanford, Georgetown, Florida, and Rollins.

Boys Golf Team 
In 2010, the boys golf team won the district and regional championship earning the schools first team bid to the state championship. The team repeated this accomplishment in 2011 reaching the state championship for back to back years.

Notable alumni
 Spencer Pigot, auto racing driver 
 Fanbo Zeng, professional basketball player

References 

Private high schools in Florida
High schools in Orange County, Florida
Educational institutions established in 2000
Private middle schools in Florida
Private elementary schools in Florida
Preparatory schools in Florida
Windermere, Florida
Nord Anglia Education
Boarding schools in Florida
2000 establishments in Florida